"Monotonía" (English: "Monotony") is a song by Colombian singer-songwriter Shakira and Puerto Rican singer Ozuna. The song was released on 19 October 2022 as the second single from Shakira's upcoming twelfth studio album. The song follows Shakira's previous single "Te Felicito" from April 2022.

Background and release 
On 6 October 2022, Shakira began posting cryptic videos on her social media, teasing new music. The first stating "No fue culpa tuya..." ("It wasn't your fault"). The following day Shakira posted a follow-up video that said "Ni tampoco mía" ("Nor mine"). The final video of these teasers said "Fue culpa de la monotonía" ("It was monotony's fault"). After these tweets, Shakira then posted a teaser to the song's music video of someone stepping on a heart.

The single was announced on 9 October 2022 and was released on 19 October 2022. The song is a bachata track and is scheduled to be included on Shakira's forthcoming album. It was her first release since she announced her breakup with Gerard Piqué and quickly gained attention with the video surpassing 14 million views in 10 hours. The video shows several different references to Shakira's relationship with Piqué from how she felt heartbroken to how she is moving on from it.

Composition  
Contrary to rumors and speculation by the media and fans, Shakira did not write the lyrics of "Monotonía". The lyrics were written almost entirely by Colombian songwriter Keityn at least a year before the song was offered to Shakira. He stated in an interview that close to the song's release Shakira updated the line "Me dejaste por tu narcisismo..." ("You walked out on me because of your narcissism...") which originally was "Fuimos víctimas del egoísmo" ("We were victims of selfishness"), stating that that was her only contribution to the lyrics.

Shakira has been open before about suffering from writer's block since she started her relationship with her ex-partner Gerard Piqué. Therefore, Monotonía becomes only the 14th song from her catalog of over 145 songs on which she did not act as a lyricist.

Music video 
The official music video was filmed on 10 and 11 September 2022 in Manresa. It was released along with the song on 19 October 2022. It was co-directed by Shakira and long-time collaborator Jaume de Laiguana.

The video starts with a depressed-looking Shakira walking through a grocery store while eating chips with her previous single "Te Felicito" playing in the background. Shakira then runs into what is presumed to be her ex-lover and starts crying while singing the first chorus of the song. As she starts backing away, the ex-lover pulls out a cannon that shoots Shakira in the chest blasting her heart out onto the floor. As Shakira lies unconscious in a pool of blood on the floor, Ozuna starts singing the chorus of the song while looking down at her. Shakira then regains consciousness and crawls on the floor picking up her beating heart with a hole in her chest. The video then transitions into a public area where Shakira is trembling and then running through a sidewalk with her heart in her hand. As Shakira keeps accidentally bumping into people, she then drops her heart while watching others step on it. Shakira then picks up her heart as she sings the chorus. The video then transitions into its final seen where Shakira walks into a room full of locked away items. Ozuna opens a metal box for Shakira so she can lock her heart away. As Ozuna locks Shakira's heart away, Shakira turns to walk out with a smile.

Critical reception
The song received generally positive reviews. Harpers Bazaar called the song's lyrics "pensive and heartbreaking". Pitchfork said that the song "perfectly captures the timbre of heartache, the kind of pain that only comes from having experienced the height of pleasure" and praised the singers' vocal delivery stating that "Ozuna's angelic croon complements Shakira's dour resignation". Variety wrote that the song and the video "encapsulates that heart-wrenching pain – literally".

Jon Pareles of The New York Times stated that "bachata puts heartbreak at a distance by placing it within a neatly syncopated grid; both Shakira and Ozuna sing like they'll get over it".

Commercial performance
Globally, the music video for the song reached over 20 million views on YouTube within its first 24 hours of its release, making it the biggest Spanish-language debut on YouTube in 2022, and became the most-viewed Latin video on its release day by a female artist in the history of YouTube. It also debuted at number one on the weekly Global YouTube Music Videos Chart with 23.6 million views from a partial week of tracking. It received another 43.4 million views during the 21–27 October tracking period. The count topped its first week's mark by 84%.

The song had the biggest debut for a female artist in history for Spotify in Mexico and Colombia. It debuted at number 12 on the global Spotify chart with 2.96 million streams.

In Spain, the song debuted at number 64 on Promusicae charts from only one day of release in a full tracking week. The song soared to number three the week after. The song was certified gold by Promusicae in 14 days for selling over 30,000 units in the country.

In the United States, the song sold 22,700 equivalent units on its first day, of which 2,000 were digital downloads and 3.1 million were on-demand streams, debuting at number one on Billboard Latin Digital Song Sales chart from a single day of tracking. The song debuted at number 65 on the Billboard Hot 100 and peaked at number three on Billboard Hot Latin Songs with 64,700 equivalent units, of which 9.4 million were from on-demand streams, and further 2,000 digital downloads, earning Shakira her 32nd top 10 hit on the chart and extending her record as the woman with the most top 10 hits on the chart. "Monotonia" also continued its reign at number one spot on Latin Digital Song Sales chart for a second chart week. It sold a total of 87,400 equivalent units in its first eight tracking days.

Charts

Monthly charts

Certifications

References 

2022 singles
2022 songs
2020s ballads
Shakira songs
Songs written by Shakira
Songs about heartache